Jean-Luc Maury-Laribière (born 22 February 1943) is a French racing driver.

References

1943 births
Living people
French racing drivers
24 Hours of Le Mans drivers
European Le Mans Series drivers